Aristeidis ("Aris") Grigoriadis (born 6 December 1985) is a Greek swimmer from Thessaloniki. He was named the 2005 Greek Male Athlete of the Year.

Career
Grigoriadis was the first Greek swimmer to be crowned world champion in the 50 m backstroke event of the 2005 World Championships in Montreal. At the European Championships of Eindhoven in 2008, he won two medals: the gold in 50 m backstroke and the silver in 100 m backstroke.

He participated at the 2012 Olympic Games in the 100 m backstroke event, in which he reached the semifinals, taking the 14th place.

References

External links
 

1985 births
Living people
Swimmers from Thessaloniki
Greek male swimmers
Male backstroke swimmers
Olympic swimmers of Greece
Swimmers at the 2004 Summer Olympics
Swimmers at the 2008 Summer Olympics
Swimmers at the 2012 Summer Olympics
World Aquatics Championships medalists in swimming
European Aquatics Championships medalists in swimming

Mediterranean Games gold medalists for Greece
Mediterranean Games silver medalists for Greece
Mediterranean Games bronze medalists for Greece
Swimmers at the 2005 Mediterranean Games
Swimmers at the 2009 Mediterranean Games
Mediterranean Games medalists in swimming